Tendinopathy is a type of tendon disorder that results in pain, swelling, and impaired function. The pain is typically worse with movement. It most commonly occurs around the shoulder (rotator cuff tendinitis, biceps tendinitis), elbow (tennis elbow, golfer's elbow), wrist, hip, knee (jumper's knee, popliteus tendinopathy), or ankle (Achilles tendinitis).

Causes may include an injury or repetitive activities. Less common causes include infection, arthritis, gout, thyroid disease, diabetes and the use of quinolone antibiotic medicines. Groups at risk include people who do manual labor, musicians, and athletes.  Diagnosis is typically based on symptoms, examination, and occasionally medical imaging. A few weeks following an injury little inflammation remains, with the underlying problem related to weak or disrupted tendon fibrils.

Treatment may include rest, NSAIDs, splinting, and physiotherapy. Less commonly steroid injections or surgery may be done. About 80% of patients recover completely within six months. Tendinopathy is relatively common. Older people are more commonly affected. It results in a large amount of missed work.

Signs and symptoms
Symptoms include tenderness on palpation, swelling, and pain, often when exercising or with a specific movement.

Cause
Causes may include an injury or repetitive activities. Groups at risk include people who do manual labor, musicians, and athletes. Less common causes include infection, arthritis, gout, thyroid disease, and diabetes. Despite the injury of the tendon, there are roads to healing which includes rehabilitation therapy and/or surgery. Obesity, or more specifically, adiposity or fatness, has also been linked to an increasing incidence of tendinopathy.

Quinolone antibiotics are associated with increased risk of tendinitis and tendon rupture.   A 2013 review found the incidence of tendon injury among those taking fluoroquinolones to be between 0.08 and 0.2%. Fluoroquinolones most frequently affect large load-bearing tendons in the lower limb, especially the Achilles tendon which ruptures in approximately 30 to 40% of cases.

Types
 Achilles tendinitis
 Calcific tendinitis
 Patellar tendinitis (jumper's knee)

Pathophysiology
As of 2016 the pathophysiology of tendinopathy is poorly understood. While inflammation appears to play a role, the relationships among changes to the structure of tissue, the function of tendons, and pain are not understood and there are several competing models, none of which have been fully validated or falsified. Molecular mechanisms involved in inflammation includes release of inflammatory cytokines like IL-1β which reduces the expression of type I collagen mRNA in human tenocytes and causes extracellular matrix degradation in the tendon. However in a recent systematic review, signs of chronic inflammation, including either the presence of inflammatory cells or an increase in inflammatory markers, were observed in the majority of tendons with tendinopathy.

There are multifactorial theories that could include: tensile overload, tenocyte related collagen synthesis disruption, load-induced ischemia, neural sprouting, thermal damage, and adaptive compressive responses. The intratendinous sliding motion of fascicles and shear force at interfaces of fascicles could be an important mechanical factor for the development of tendinopathy and predispose tendons to rupture.

The most commonly accepted cause for this condition is seen to be an overuse syndrome in combination with intrinsic and extrinsic factors leading to what may be seen as a progressive interference or the failing of the innate healing response. Tendinopathy involves cellular apoptosis, matrix disorganization and neovascularization.

Classic characteristics of "tendinosis" include degenerative changes in the collagenous matrix, hypercellularity, hypervascularity, and a lack of inflammatory cells which has challenged the original misnomer "tendinitis".

Histological findings include granulation tissue, microrupture, degenerative changes, and there is no traditional inflammation. As a consequence, "lateral elbow tendinopathy or tendinosis" is used instead of "lateral epicondylitis".

Examination of tennis elbow tissue reveals noninflammatory tissue, so the term "angiofibroblastic tendinosis" is used.

Cultures from tendinopathic tendons contain an increased production of type III collagen.

Longitudinal sonogram of the lateral elbow displays thickening and heterogeneity of the common extensor tendon that is consistent with tendinosis, as the ultrasound reveals calcifications, intrasubstance tears, and marked irregularity of the lateral epicondyle. Although the term "epicondylitis" is frequently used to describe this disorder, most histopathologic findings of studies have displayed no evidence of an acute, or a chronic inflammatory process. Histologic studies have demonstrated that this condition is the result of tendon degeneration, which causes normal tissue to be replaced by a disorganized arrangement of collagen. Therefore, the disorder is more appropriately referred to as "tendinosis" or "tendinopathy" rather than "tendinitis".

Colour Doppler ultrasound reveals structural tendon changes, with vascularity and hypo-echoic areas that correspond to the areas of pain in the extensor origin.

Load-induced non-rupture tendinopathy in humans is associated with an increase in the ratio of collagen III:I proteins, a shift from large to small diameter collagen fibrils, buckling of the collagen fascicles in the tendon extracellular matrix, and buckling of the tenocyte cells and their nuclei.

Diagnosis 

Symptoms can vary from aches or pains and local joint stiffness, to a burning that surrounds the whole joint around the inflamed tendon. In some cases, swelling occurs along with heat and redness, and there may be visible knots surrounding the joint. With this condition, the pain is usually worse during and after activity, and the tendon and joint area can become stiff the following day as muscles tighten from the movement of the tendon. Many patients report stressful situations in their life in correlation with the beginnings of pain which may contribute to the symptoms.

Medical imaging 

Ultrasound imaging can be used to evaluate tissue strain, as well as  other mechanical properties. Ultrasound-based techniques are becoming more popular because of its affordability, safety, and speed. Ultrasound can be used for imaging tissues, and the sound waves can also provide information about the mechanical state of the tissue.

Treatment

Treatment of tendon injuries is largely conservative. Use of non-steroidal anti-inflammatory drugs (NSAIDs), rest, and gradual return to exercise is a common therapy. Resting assists in the prevention of further damage to the tendon. Ice, compression and elevation are also frequently recommended. Physical therapy, occupational therapy, orthotics or braces may also be useful. Initial recovery is typically within two to three days and full recovery is within three to six months. Tendinosis occurs as the acute phase of healing has ended (six to eight weeks) but has left the area insufficiently healed. Treatment of tendinitis helps reduce some of the risks of developing tendinosis, which takes longer to heal.

There is tentative evidence that low-level laser therapy may also be beneficial in treating tendinopathy. The effects of deep transverse friction massage for treating tennis elbow and lateral knee tendinitis is unclear.

NSAIDs
NSAIDs may be used to help with pain. They however do not alter long term outcomes. Other types of pain medication, like paracetamol, may be just as useful.

Steroids
Steroid injections have not been shown to have long term benefits but have been shown to be more effective than NSAIDs in the short term. They appear to have little benefit in tendinitis of the rotator cuff. There are some concerns that they may have negative effects.

Other injections
There is insufficient evidence on the routine use of injection therapies (autologous blood, platelet-rich plasma, deproteinised haemodialysate, aprotinin, polysulphated glycosaminoglycan, skin derived fibroblasts etc.) for treating Achilles tendinopathy. As of 2014 there was insufficient evidence to support the use of platelet-rich therapies for treating musculoskeletal soft tissue injuries such as ligament, muscle and tendon tears and tendinopathies.

Prognosis
Initial recovery is usually within two to three months, and full recovery usually within three to six months. About 80% of people will fully recover within 12 months.

Epidemiology
Tendon injury and resulting tendinopathy are responsible for up to 30% of consultations to sports doctors and other musculoskeletal health providers. Tendinopathy is most often seen in tendons of athletes either before or after an injury but is becoming more common in non-athletes and sedentary populations. For example, the majority of patients with Achilles tendinopathy in a general population-based study did not associate their condition with a sporting activity. In another study the population incidence of Achilles tendinopathy increased sixfold from 1979–1986 to 1987–1994. The incidence of rotator cuff tendinopathy ranges from 0.3% to 5.5% and annual prevalence from 0.5% to 7.4%.

Terminology
Tendinitis is a very common, but misleading term. By definition, the suffix "-itis" means "inflammation of". Inflammation is the body's local response to tissue damage which involves red blood cells, white blood cells, blood proteins with dilation of blood vessels around the site of injury. Tendons are relatively avascular.
Corticosteroids are drugs that reduce inflammation. Corticosteroids can be useful to relieve chronic tendinopathy pain, improve function, and reduce swelling in the short term. However, there is a greater risk of long-term recurrence. They are typically injected along with a small amount of a numbing drug called lidocaine. Research shows that tendons are weaker following corticosteroid injections.

Tendinitis is still a very common diagnosis, though research increasingly documents that what is thought to be tendinitis is usually tendinosis.

Anatomically close but separate conditions are:
Enthesitis, wherein there is inflammation of the entheses, the sites where tendons or ligaments insert into the bone. It is associated with HLA B27 arthropathies such as ankylosing spondylitis, psoriatic arthritis, and reactive arthritis.
Apophysitis, inflammation of the bony attachment, generally associated with overuse among growing children.

Research

The use of a nitric oxide delivery system (glyceryl trinitrate patches) applied over the area of maximal tenderness was found to reduce pain and increase range of motion and strength.

A promising therapy involves eccentric loading exercises involving lengthening muscular contractions.

Other animals
Bowed tendon is a horseman's term for tendinitis (inflammation) and tendinosis (degeneration), most commonly seen in the superficial digital flexor tendon in the front leg of horses.

Mesenchymal stem cells, derived from a horse's bone marrow or fat, are currently being used for tendon repair in horses.

References

External links 
 Questions and Answers about Bursitis and Tendinitis - US National Institute of Arthritis and Musculoskeletal and Skin Diseases

Disorders of fascia
Inflammations
Overuse injuries
Pain
Wikipedia medicine articles ready to translate